Nick Alexander may refer to:

Nick Alexander (author)
Nick Alexander (ski jumper) (born 1988)
Nick Alexander (comedian), see Lee Camp (comedian)
Nick Alexander, member of the Eagles of Death Metal crew who was killed at the Bataclan during the November 2015 Paris attacks

See also
Nicholas Alexander (disambiguation)